Arundel Cricket Club are a cricket club in the town of Arundel in West Sussex, England, which was founded in 1704. The club's first XI plays in Division 1 of the West Sussex Invitation League They currently have three Saturday League sides, a Club (Friendly) XI and multiple Junior teams ranging from U10s to U16s.

The earliest known mention of an Arundel team is a match in 1702 when a team formed by Charles Lennox, 1st Duke of Richmond played against them at an unknown venue.

References

External links
 Arundel Cricket Club

1704 establishments in England
Cricket in West Sussex
English club cricket teams
English cricket teams in the 18th century
Former senior cricket clubs
Arundel
Sports clubs established in the 1700s